Jan "Le Grand" Boubli (born 13 November) is a French professional poker player from Paris.

Jan Boubli was a dentist for 22 years before retiring.

In July 2003 he finished second at the World Poker Tour (WPT) second season Grand Prix de Paris.

In September 2005 he won the European Poker Tour (EPT) second season Barcelona Open. He defeated Christer Johansson heads-up to win  €426,000 ($528,195).

As of 2008, his total live tournament winnings exceed $1,200,000.

Notes

External links
World Poker Tour profile

French poker players
European Poker Tour winners
French dentists
Year of birth missing (living people)
Living people